The Twelve Months is a 1973 Soviet Lenfilm fantasy film directed by Anatoliy Granik based on the play by Samuil Marshak adapted from the fairy tale with the same name.

Cast
 Natalya Popova — Stepdaughter
 Marina Maltseva — Stepsister 
 Olga Wiklandt — Stepmother
 Liana Zhvaniya — The Queen
 Nikolay Volkov — Professor
 Tatiyana Pelttser — Gofmejsterina
 Leonid Kuravlyov — Soldier
 Konstantin Adashevskiy — The Head of the Royal Guard
 Alexander Sokolov — The Chancellors your 
 Georgy Teikh — Royal Prosecutor
 Lev Lemke — The Eastern Ambassador
 Alexey Kozhevnikov — The Western Ambassador
 Arkady Trusov — December
 Boris Ryzhukhin —January
 Alexander Afanasiev — February
 Alexander Gavrilov — March
 Andrey Bosov — April
 Victor Perevalov — May
 Victor Semyonovsky — June
 Sergey Dvoretsky — July
 Valentin Zhilyaev — August
 Anatoly Stepanov — September
 Nikolay Kuzmin — November
 Lev Usachev — The Moon

Plot 
A young beautiful orphan Girl lives with her uncaring Stepmother, who treats her like a servant, and her spoiled foolish Stepsister. The two of them send her to gather firewood on New Year's Eve. While in the forest, the Girl discovers that odd things are happening: animals begin to talk and play like humans. An elderly Soldier, whom she befriends, tells her that on that day miracles always happen. He mentions that an ancestor of his was lucky enough to meet the Twelve Months in person on New Year's Day.

Meanwhile, the Queen of that land, a selfish teenager, has one of her wild ideas: she wants a whole basket of fresh snowdrops as a New Year present. The person who brings it is promised an equal basket filled with gold.

The main heroine's Stepmother and Stepsister, obsessed with the thought of gold, do not particularly care that snowdrop will not bloom till spring. At least, they don't care as long as they wouldn't have to search for the flowers themselves. After a heated argument about which of them will go, they realize the easiest decision is to send the Stepdaughter. So she comes home only to find out she has to go into the woods again, to look for flowers.

The Girl naturally gives up after a little while, and she already prepares to die in the frost. But she accidentally comes across a bonfire lit by twelve people – who turn out to be the Twelve Months themselves. She asks permission to warm herself by the fire. The sterner Winter Months hesitate, but the softer-hearted Spring and Summer Months welcome the Girl.

Eventually, her hosts find out about her impossible task. The Girl is about to leave, but the Month of April begs his brothers to let him rule the earth for an hour, so that the Girl could gather her snowdrops. They agree without much protest, and soon April brings a temporary springtime, and the ground is white with snowdrops.

While the Girl picks the flowers, the Months talk about her. It is revealed that they know her well by sight and have been always moved by her kind and generous spirit, and that April is very much in love with her. Upon her return, April presents her with a magical ring that would allow her to call on them whenever she's in trouble. The Months strictly forbid her to tell anyone about her acquaintance with them.

The Girl returns home happy and contented. All seems to be well, but her envious Stepsister steals her ring while she's asleep, and the Queen demands to know where exactly the snowdrops were found…

External links
 

Lenfilm films
1970s Russian-language films
1970s fantasy drama films
Soviet fantasy drama films
1973 drama films
1973 films
Films based on fairy tales